Wilhelm Oswald Lohse (13 February 1845 – 14 May 1915) was a German astronomer. He first worked at the private Bothkamp Observatory, and starting in 1874 at the Potsdam Astrophysical Observatory, being its Chief Astronomer at the time of his death.

 His main work involved the investigation of the surface features of Mars and Jupiter. After this he explored binary stars, and finally worked on the spectroscopy of stars, which included laboratory experiments regarding the spectra of metals.
 
Craters on Mars and on the Moon were named in his honor.

External links

Obituaries
AN 201 (1915) 47/48 
PASP 27 (1915) 202

1845 births
1915 deaths
19th-century German astronomers
20th-century German astronomers